Claris Gustavius "Crip" Hall (October 8, 1901 – January 14, 1961) was a noted lawyer and politician who served as the Secretary of State of Arkansas for 25 years. He took the nickname "Crip" following a lifelong handicap caused by a childhood case of polio.

Early life and education 
Hall was born on October 8, 1901 in Social Hill, Arkansas, an unincorporated community near Malvern, Arkansas in the Ouachita Mountains, to John R. Hall and Elizabeth Hall. He attended Malvern School District and played catcher on the baseball team. Following graduation, he attended the University of Arkansas, earning a degree in journalism in 1924. Hall was active on campus, becoming a member of the Kappa Sigma fraternity, serving as president of the sophomore class, and editor and business manager of The Arkansas Traveler, the UA student newspaper. He also founded the Arkansas Booster Club.

He married Nancy Pearl Johnson on October 5, 1929. Hall enrolled in the Arkansas Law School, now known as the William H. Bowen School of Law, and began practicing law with E. B. Dillon, representing a major oil company statewide.

Political career

Hall sought to enter politics in 1934 by challenging incumbent Arkansas Secretary of State Ed F. McDonald in the Democratic primary. During the Solid South, the Democratic Party held firm control of virtually every office in The South, including Arkansas. Winning the Democratic primary was considered tantamount to election. McDonald defeated Hall by a 60%-40% margin.

References

External links
 C.G. "Crip" Hall Materials - University of Arkansas Libraries, Special Collections

1901 births
1961 deaths
Deaths in Arkansas
People from Malvern, Arkansas
Secretaries of State of Arkansas
Arkansas Democrats
American politicians with disabilities
People with polio
University of Arkansas alumni